The 2016 AIHL season was the 17th season of the Australian Ice Hockey League (AIHL). It ran from 23 April 2016 until 21 August 2016, with the Goodall Cup finals following on 27 and 28 August. The Melbourne Ice won the H Newman Reid Trophy after finishing the regular season with the most points. The Newcastle North Stars won the Goodall Cup for the second year in a row after defeating the CBR Brave in the final.

Teams
In 2016 the AIHL had 8 teams competing in the league.

League business
In September 2015 it was announced that the Medibank Icehouse had been renamed the O'Brien Group Arena following a lease takeover by the O'Brien Catering Group. The league announced that the Sydney Bears will host two games against the Melbourne Ice in Queensland during the 2016 season. The games, promoted under the title of the Brisbane Battle, will be held at Iceworld Boondall and Iceworld Acacia Ridge on 14 and 15 May respectively. The AIHL have not held a game in Queensland since the suspension of the Gold Coast Blue Tongues in 2012. In February 2016 the Sydney Ice Dogs announced that Reach Crane Trucks had renewed their sponsorship for 2016, extending the original three-year deal that was signed in 2013. The Ice Dogs later signed TAFE SWSi Aboriginal Learning Circle as a new sponsor for the season. Also in February Hards Transport renewed their naming rights sponsorship of the Adelaide Adrenaline. The Adrenaline also signed new sponsors Reading Cinemas, Paxton Wines and Mortgage Choice Malvern and extended their deal with the Hilton Hotel's MyBar as their official post-game venue. In March 2016 the CBR Brave signed Casino Canberra and McDonald's ACT as major sponsors and Canberra Toyota as their vehicle sponsor. The CBR Brave also extended their deal with Anytime Fitness as the club's official gym partner and the Hellenic Club of Canberra as their post-game partner and renewed their sponsorship deal with Jordo's Chop Shop. On 21 March 2016 the Bears announced that they had formed a partnership with the Australian Defence Force Ice Hockey Association's Army Knights for 2016. This was followed by the CBR Brave forming a partnership with the Navy Tigersharks. Both partnerships aim to help promote ice hockey within the Defence Force and develop emerging talent. The Bears partnership deal also includes discounted tickets for Defence Force members during the season. The Sydney Bears have reached a deal with Hawkesbury Radio to broadcast at least two of their home games for the 2016 season while also continuing to broadcast via their normal Mixlr stream. The Perth Thunder will also start live broadcasting their home games via Mixlr for the 2016 season. In April the Brave announced a partnership with the Canberra Cavalry of the Australian Baseball League to help increase promotion between the two teams. On 22 April the Perth Thunder announced that they had signed Smooth Financial Services as a platinum sponsor for the 2016 season. In May 2016 Hi-Tec Oils renewed their major sponsorship with the Sydney Bears for the season. Also in May The James Hotel signed a deal with the Melbourne Mustangs to become a major sponsor and host the club's pre and post-game functions.

Exhibition games
On 31 March 2016 the Melbourne Ice and Melbourne Mustangs competed in an exhibition game at the O’Brien Group Arena with the Ice winning 5–1. The 2016 edition of the Wilson Cup was held in March and April 2016. The tournament featured the three New South Wales based clubs competing in a double round-robin before a final between the two top ranked teams. The Sydney Bears finished first in the round robin stage, winning three of their four games, and were drawn against the Sydney Ice Dogs in the final. The Bears won the final 3–1, claiming their third Wilson Cup title.

Personnel changes
In October 2015 it was announced that Vladimir Rubes had stepped down as head coach of the Sydney Bears due to family commitments. Rubes was replaced by assistant Ron Kuprowsky to the position of head coach. Kuprowsky was previously coach of the Sydney Ice Dogs before joining the Bears in 2015. Also in October the Sydney Ice Dogs announced their 2016 committee with Tim Flynn moving from the head coach position to the role of general manager, taking over the position from Anthony Wilson. Flynn's role as general manager for the Sydney Ice Dogs lasted until March 2016 with the club replacing him with former player Jason Juba. In November 2015 the Melbourne Mustangs announced that Brad Vigon had resigned from the position of head coach due to family commitments. Vigon was replaced by assistant coach Michael Flaherty with the Mustangs also adding former Australian national team players Damian Holland and Jon Moses as Flaherty's new assistant coaches. The Mustangs also announced that Andrew McDowell had stepped down from the position of Vice President in order to focus on his role of Director of Hockey Operations. He was replaced by Myles Harris.

In December 2015 the Adelaide Adrenaline announced that head coach Ryan O'Handley had stepped down from the position of head coach due to family commitments. O'Handley however moved into the positions of Vice President and Director of Hockey Operations at the club. A couple of weeks later the Adrenaline signed former AIHL and Australian national team player Trevor Walsh as O'Handley's replacement. Following the appointment of Walsh as head coach the Adrenaline also announced that Gordon Cochrane and Sami Mantere had been signed as assistant coaches for 2016. In March 2016 the Sydney Ice Dogs announced that they had signed former Sydney Bears head coach Vladimir Rubes to the position of head coach. Rubes stepped down from his position of head coach of the Sydney Bears in October 2015 citing family commitments. Also in March the CBR Brave re-signed head coach Josh Unice along with assistant coaches David Rogina and Stuart Philps for the 2016 season.

In June 2016 the Adrenaline relieved Trevor Walsh of his duties as head coach. He was replaced by former Australian national team assistant coach Eric Lien. On 17 August, three days before the final round of the regular season, the Brave announced that Josh Unice had resigned from his position of head coach due to a number of personal issues outside of hockey. He was replaced by the club's assistant coaches for the remainder of the season.

Player transfers

Interclub transfers

Retirements

New signings

Players lost

Regular season
The regular season is set to start on 23 April 2016 and run through to 21 August 2016 before the top four teams advance to compete in the Goodall Cup playoff series. A weeks break will be held in June to accommodate the All-Star Weekend which is scheduled for 11 and 12 June 2016 in Penrith, New South Wales. The AIHL will hold their first games in Queensland since 2012 after they announced that the Sydney Bears and Melbourne Ice will compete in a double header in Brisbane.  The games, promoted under the title of the Brisbane Battle, will be held at Iceworld Boondall and Iceworld Acacia Ridge on 14 and 15 May respectively.

In March 2016 it was reported that the Adelaide Ice Arena had to close their large ice surface for repairs following failed pressure tests. The repairs resulted in the league pushing back the start Adrenaline's home season from 23 April to 15 May and rescheduling of four games. Game 1 between the North Stars and Adrenaline at the Adelaide Ice Arena was pushed back to 17 July from its original date of 23 April. Game 81 between the Thunder and the North Stars at the Perth Ice Arena was moved forward into the vacant 23 April slot after originally being scheduled for 17 July. The double header between the Adrenaline and the Thunder at the Adelaide Ice Arena was also pushed back from its original date of 30 April and 1 May to 21 and 22 May. On 5 June Game 48 between the Sydney Ice Dogs and Melbourne Mustangs was postponed due to flooding at the Liverpool Catholic Club Ice Rink. The match was later rescheduled for 7 August at the same venue.

25 June game between the Melbourne Ice and Sydney Bears served as the third annual Canada Day Classic match. The Bears won the game 4–3 following a shootout to claim the title for the third straight year. On 6 August the Sydney Ice Dogs hosted the Adelaide Adrenaline in the Matt Clark Memorial Game, part of the clubs Leukaemia fundraising night. The Ice Dogs wore the old Warringah Bombers jersey, dedicated to former Bombers player Matt Clark who died from leukaemia in 1995. The Ice Dogs won the game 9–8. 13 August match between the Adelaide Adrenaline and CBR Brave served as the second annual beyondblue Cup, setup to help raise awareness for the charity. The Brave won the Cup for the second year in a row, defeating the Adrenaline 5–4 following a shootout.

The Melbourne Ice won the H Newman Reid Trophy after finishing first in the regular season with 66 points. Following the end of the season the AIHL announced the winners of the 2016 awards. Adelaide Adrenaline's Wehebe Darge won the Most Valuable Player and Anthony Kimlin of the Sydney Bears won the Goaltender of the Year. The CBR Brave's Jan Safar won the Defenceman of the Year and Casey Kubara was awarded both the Rookie of the Year and Local Player of the Year. The Melbourne Ice's Brent Laver was named Coach of the Year.

April

May

June

July

August

Standings

Source

Statistics

Scoring leaders
List shows the ten top skaters sorted by points, then goals.

Leading goaltenders
Only the top five goaltenders, based on save percentage with a minimum 40% of the team's ice time.

Season awards

Below lists the 2016 AIHL regular season award winners.

Source

Goodall Cup playoffs
The 2016 playoffs started on 27 August 2016 with the Goodall Cup final being held on 28 August. Following the end of the regular season the top four teams advanced to the playoff series. All three games were held at the O'Brien Group Arena in Docklands, Victoria, the home of the Melbourne Ice and Melbourne Mustangs. The series was a single game elimination with the two winning semi-finalists advancing to the Goodall Cup final. The finals were again sponsored by Air Canada, their fourth year in a row. The Goodall Cup was won by the Newcastle North Stars (6th title) who defeated the CBR Brave 2–1 in regular time. North Stars' goaltender Dayne Davis was named the finals Most Valuable Player.

Semi-finals
All times are UTC+10:00

Final

All-Star weekend

The 2016 AIHL All-Star Weekend was held at the Penrith Ice Palace on 11 and 12 June 2016. The format of the weekend remained unchanged from 2015 with a skills competition on 11 June and an all-stars game on 12 June. Sydney Bears' Michael Schlamp was announced as captain of one of the two teams for the second year in a row. Matt Armstrong of the Melbourne Ice was announced as the second team's captain, replacing Brian Bales from 2015. APA Group re-signed as sponsor of the weekend after sponsoring the 2015 inaugural event. Fox Sports also broadcast a 90-minute special from the weekend.

The Skills competition saw CBR Brave players take out three of the seven events, while both the Melbourne Mustangs and Sydney Bears picked up two each. On 12 June Team Schlamp defeated Team Armstrong 10–9 at the Penrith Ice Palace to win the 2016 All-Star Game. Michael Dorr of the Perth Thunder was named the most valuable player of the match and the best forward. The Sydney Bears' Ryan Annesley and Anthony Kimlin were named best defenceman and best goaltender respectively, and the Perth Thunder's Rob Haselhurst was named the best Australian player.

Skills competition
Fastest Skater: Patrick O’Kane (Melbourne Mustangs)
Breakaway Challenge: Geordie Wudrick (CBR Brave)
Shooting Accuracy: Stephen Blunden (CBR Brave)
Stickhandling: Casey Kubara (CBR Brave)
Hardest Shot: James Isaacs (Melbourne Mustangs)
Elimination Shootout: Brian Funes (Sydney Bears)
Goaltender Race: Anthony Kimlin (Sydney Bears)

All-star game

References

External links
The Australian Ice Hockey League

2016 in ice hockey
2016 in Australian sport
2016